Linda Hepner (born May 16, 1949) is a Canadian politician, who served as the 36th mayor of Surrey, British Columbia as of the 2014 municipal election.

Mayor of Surrey (2014–2018) 

After joining the city staff as a manager in 1985, Hepner was first elected to Surrey City Council in 2005 on Doug McCallum's Surrey Electors Team slate; however, McCallum himself was defeated in the mayoral race by Dianne Watts, and Hepner joined Watts' Surrey First team.

During her time as Mayor, Hepner as stated that she will "break ground" with Surrey's LRT, starting with phase 1.

Hepner decided not to seek re-election and appointed Surrey First City Councillor Tom Gill to run for mayor on the Surrey First slate. On October 20, 2018, former mayor Doug McCallum was elected to succeed her in the 2018 Surrey municipal election.

Electoral record

2014 Surrey Municipal Election

References

External links 
 City of Surrey Mayor Linda Hepner Biography

1949 births
Living people
Mayors of Surrey, British Columbia
Politicians from Fredericton
Surrey, British Columbia city councillors
Women mayors of places in British Columbia